Explosia a.s. is an explosives manufacturer in Semtín, a suburb of Pardubice in the Czech Republic. The company was established in 1920. Its most famous product is the Semtex plastic explosive, the name is formed as a combination of the first letters of the Semtín village and the company name.

References

External links

Manufacturing companies established in 1920
Manufacturing companies of the Czech Republic
Explosives manufacturers
Manufacturing companies of Czechoslovakia
Czech brands
1920 establishments in Czechoslovakia